Joseph Auguste Anténor Firmin (18 October 1850 – 19 September 1911), better known as Anténor Firmin, was a Haitian barrister and philosopher, pioneering anthropologist, journalist, and politician. Firmin is best known for his book De l'égalité des races humaines, which was published in 1885 as a rebuttal to French writer Count Arthur de Gobineau's work Essai sur l'inégalité des races humaines. Gobineau's book asserted the superiority of the Aryan race and the inferiority of Blacks and other people of color. Firmin's book argued the opposite, that "all men are endowed with the same qualities and the same faults, without distinction of color or anatomical form. The races are equal". He was marginalized at the time for his beliefs that all human races were equal.

Biography 
Joseph Auguste Anténor Firmin was born as the third generation of a post-independent Haiti in a working-class family. Firmin advanced quickly at his studies and started teaching when he was 17. He studied accounting and law. He found early jobs Haitian Customs Office and as a clerk for a private business. He quit his clerical position to teach Greek, Latin and French.

He was close to the liberal party and he started the newspaper “Le Messager du Nord”. The political turmoil surrounding the new government of General Salomon forced him into exile in Paris where he served as a diplomat. During this time, he was admitted to the Societe d'Anthropologie de Paris where he began writing De L'Egalite des Races Humaines.

Firmin attended meetings of the Société as a regular member. But he was silenced by a racialist physical anthropology dominant at the time and due to racism. The transcripts of the Société’s deliberations included in the Mémoires show that Firmin rose to speak only twice, and on both occasions he was silenced by racialist or racist comments.

Work 
Anténor Firmin's major work, De l’égalité des races humaines (anthropologie positive) was published in Paris in 1885. Its importance was unrecognized for several decades. The recovered text was translated by Haitian scholar Asselin Charles in 2000. It was published in English as The Equality of the Human Races (Positivist Anthropology), 115 years after its original publication. Today he is considered one of the most important contributors to anthropology.

Firmin pioneered the integration of race and physical anthropology and may be the first Black anthropologist. His work was recognized not only in Haiti but also among  African scholars as an early work of négritude. He influenced Jean Price-Mars, the founder of Haitian ethnology and on American anthropologist Melville Herskovits.

Following the ideas of Auguste Comte, Firmin was a stark positivist who believed that the empiricism used to study humanity was a counter to the speculative philosophical theories about the inequalities of races. Firmin sought to redefine the science of Anthropology in his work. He critiqued certain conventionally-held aspects of anthropology, such as craniometry and racialist interpretations of human physical data. He was the first to point out how racial typologies failed to account for the successes of those of mixed race as well as one of the first to state an accurate scientific basis for skin pigmentation.

Of the Equality of Human Races

In his best known work, De l'égalité des races humaines ("Of the Equality of Human Races") published in 1885, Firmin tackles two bases of existing theories on black inferiority in an effort to critique Gobineau's De l'Inégalité des Races Humaines ("Of the Inequality of Human Races"). On the one hand, Firmin challenges the idea of brain size or cephalic index as a measure of human intelligence and on the other he reasserts the presence of African Blacks in Pharaonic Egypt. He then delves into the significance of the Haitian Revolution of 1804 and ensuing achievements of Haitians such as Léon Audain and Isaïe Jeanty in medicine and science and Edmond Paul in the social sciences. (Both Audain and Jeanty had obtained prizes from the Académie Nationale de Médecine.)

Founder of Pan-Africanism
Firmin is one of three Caribbean men who launched the idea of Pan-Africanism at the end of the 19th century to combat colonialism in Africa. As a candidate in Haiti's 1902 presidential elections, he declared that the Haitian state should "serve in the rehabilitation of Africa". Along with  Trinidadian lawyer Henry Sylvester Williams and fellow Haitian Bénito Sylvain, he was the organizer of the First Pan-African Conference which took place in London in 1900. That conference launched the Pan-Africanism movement. W. E. B. Du Bois attended the conference and was put in charge of drafting the general report. After the conference, five pan-African congresses were held in the 20th century, which eventually led to the creation of the African Union.

Firmin was invested in the three main elements of Pan-Africanist thought: the rejection of the postulate of race inequality, proof that Africans were capable of civilization, and examples of successful Africans producing knowledge in diverse fields. In looking to move away from the biological understanding of race, Firmin's scientific approach was informed by the idea of a Black Egypt as the source of Greek civilization.

Pan-Caribbeanism

Anténor Firmin devised between 1875 and 1898 a Caribbean Confederation project which envisioned the unification of Cuba, Haiti, the Dominican Republic, Jamaica and Puerto Rico.

Firmin was interested in creating political and social unity throughout the Caribbean. This can be seen through his relationship with Puerto Rican intellectual and physician Ramon Emeterio Betances. The pair first met in a meeting of the Society of Latin American Unity, an organisation that served as a social and political network for exiles from Latin America. It is here where they discussed the ideals of political sovereignty throughout the region. Unlike other icons from the Cuban and Puerto Rican separatist movements, Betances celebration of the Haitian Revolution countered those who did not see Haiti as an ideal revolutionary model, thus excluding it in their own plans for a Hispanic Caribbean federation.

Letters from St. Thomas 
After a failed bid for presidency in 1902, Firmin was sent to live in exile in St. Thomas. In his last work, Letters from St. Thomas, Firmin remaps Haiti in the archipelago of the Americas, outlining its significance to the region as a whole. The letters reinforces Firmin's anti-essentialist agenda first displayed in L'Egalite des Races Humaines.

Bibliography

French 
De l'égalité des races humaines - published 1885
 Haïti et la France - published 1891
 Une défense - published 1892
 Diplomate et diplomatie - published 1898
 M. Roosevelt, Président des États-Unis et la République d'Haïti - published 1905
 Lettres de Saint-Thomas - published 1910

English 

 The Equality of the Human Races: Positivist Anthropology, Translated from the French by Asselin Charles with introduction by Carolyn Fluehr-Lobban.

Secondary literature 

 Beckett, Greg.  (2017).  ‘The abolition of all privilege: Race, equality, and freedom in the work of Anténor Firmin’.  Critique of Anthropology 37.2: 160–178.
 Bernasconi, Robert.  (2008).  ‘A Haitian in Paris: Anténor Firmin as a philosopher against racism’.  Patterns of Prejudice 42.4–5: 365–383.
 Bernasconi, Robert.  (2019).  ‘A most dangerous myth’.  Angelaki 24.2: 92–103.
Douglass W. Leonard, “Writing Against the Grain: Antenor Firmin and the Refutation of Nineteenth Century European Race Science”, in Black Intellectuals in the Atlantic World and Beyond, edited by Kendahl Radcliffe, Jennifer Scott, and Anja Werner, University Press of Mississippi.
 Boas, Franz.  (1911).  Mind of primitive man.  New York: Macmillan.
 Boas, Franz.  (1940).  Race, language and culture.  New York: Macmillan.
 Charity-Hudley, Anne H., Christine Mallinson, & Mary Bucholtz.  (In press).  ‘Toward racial justice in linguistics: Interdisciplinary insights into theorizing race in the discipline and diversifying the profession’.  Language 96.4.  To appear December 2020.
Drouin-Hans, Anne-Marie, "Hierarchy of Races, Hierarchy in Gender: Anténor Firmin and Clémence Royer". Ludus Vitalis.
Fluehr-Lobban, Carolyn, 'Anténor Firmin and Haiti’s contribution to anthropology', Gradhiva.

Notes

References
 
Joseph, Celucien L. From Toussaint to Price-Mars: Rhetoric, Race, and Religion in Haitian Thought (CreateSpace Independent Publishing Platform, 2013)
 Fluehr‑Lobban, Carolyn, (2018). « A 19th Century Haitian Pioneering Anthropologist: An Intellectual Biography of Anténor Firmin » in Bérose - Encyclopédie internationale des histoires de l’anthropologie

Further reading 

 Antenor Firmin predicted America’s first Black president in 1885! by Carolyn Fluehr-Lobban
Anténor Firmin biography published by Linguistic Society of America.

External links
 Une Défense in the Digital Library of the Caribbean
 M. Roosevelt, Président des Etats-Unis et la République d'Haïti in the Digital Library of the Caribbean
 Anténor Firmin at Île en île . .
"Firmin, Anténor (1850-1911)" at BEROSE - International Encyclopaedia of the Histories of Anthropology, Paris, 2018.

1850 births
1911 deaths
Haitian anthropologists
Haitian educators
Haitian journalists
Government ministers of Haiti
Haitian non-fiction writers
Haitian male writers
People from Cap-Haïtien
Haitian pan-Africanists
African Union
Male non-fiction writers